Saint Nicasius of Reims (d. 407 or 451) was a Bishop of Reims.  He founded the first Reims Cathedral and is the patron saint of smallpox victims.

Vandals
Sources placing his death in 407 credit him with prophesying the invasion of France by the Vandals. He notified his people of this vision, telling them to prepare. When asked if the people should fight or not, Nicasius responded, "Let us abide the mercy of God and pray for our enemies. I am ready to give myself for my people." Later, when the barbarians were at the gates of the city, he decided to attempt to slow them down so that more of his people could escape.  He was killed by the Vandals either at the altar of his church or in its doorway.  He was killed with Jucundus, his lector, Florentius, his deacon, and Eutropia, his virgin sister.

After the killing of Nicasius and his colleagues, the Vandals are said to have been frightened away from the area, according to some sources even leaving the treasure they had already gathered.

Accounts of his martyrdom credit him with being among the cephalophores ("head-carriers") like Saint Denis. Nicasius was said to have been reciting Psalm 119: he was then decapitated as he reached the verse Adhaesit pavimento anima mea ("My soul is attached unto dust") and then continued reciting Vivifica me Domine secundum verbum tuum ("Revive me, Lord, with your words") even after his head had fallen to the ground. He was sometimes depicted in art walking with the upper part of his head and its miter in his hand.

Huns
Sources placing his death in 451 record similar acts but concerning the Huns rather than the Vandals. These sources  but not those concerning the Vandals  further relate that Nicasius survived a bout of smallpox, This claim has been made more credible by research showing a long history of smallpox in Egypt, suggestions that it spread through the Roman Empire, and identification of 6th century outbreaks with the disease.

Legacy
From his supposed survival of smallpox, Nicasius became the patron saint of smallpox victims. One prayer ran:In the name of our Lord Jesus Christ, may the Lord protect these persons and may the work of these virgins ward off the smallpox. St. Nicaise had the smallpox and he asked the Lord [to preserve] whoever carried his name inscribed. O St. Nicaise! Thou illustrious bishop and martyr, pray for me, a sinner, and defend me by thy intercession from this disease. Amen.Moore, James C. The History of the Small Pox. Longman, Hurst, Rees, Orme, and Brown, 1815. Accessed 28 Jan 2013.

A Benedictine abbey in Rheims was later named in his honor.

References

External links
 santiebeati.it: San Nicasio di Reims
Sanctoral.com: Saint Nicasius and his companions

407 deaths
451 deaths
Bishops of Reims
5th-century bishops in Gaul
5th-century Christian saints
Cephalophores
Gallo-Roman saints
Executed French people
Year of birth unknown
Smallpox